Michael Joseph Roche (July 22, 1878 – July 1, 1964) was a United States district judge of the United States District Court for the Northern District of California.

Education and career

Born in An Rinn, County Waterford, Ireland, the son of William and Bridget Foley Roche, Roche received a Bachelor of Laws from Valparaiso University School of Law in 1908. He entered private practice in San Francisco, California in 1908, and was an assistant district attorney of San Francisco from 1908 to 1910. He was a judge of the Municipal Court of San Francisco from 1910 to 1914, and of the Superior Court of California in San Francisco from 1918 to 1935.

Federal judicial service

On August 21, 1935, Roche was nominated by President Franklin D. Roosevelt to a seat on the United States District Court for the Northern District of California vacated by Judge Frank Henry Kerrigan. Roche was confirmed by the United States Senate on August 23, 1935, and received his commission on August 24, 1935. He served as Chief Judge from 1948 to 1958, assuming senior status on March 1, 1958 and serving in that capacity until his death on July 1, 1964.

Notable cases

Roche presided over the trial of Tokyo Rose. He also denied a writ of habeas corpus from lawyer James Purcell on behalf of Mitsuye Endo and 120,000 persons of Japanese descent challenging their wartime detention as unlawful. The Supreme Court heard the case, Ex parte Endo and freed Endo.

References

Sources
 

1878 births
1964 deaths
California state court judges
Judges of the United States District Court for the Northern District of California
United States district court judges appointed by Franklin D. Roosevelt
20th-century American judges
Superior court judges in the United States
Valparaiso University alumni